The Progress Party's Youth (FpU), is the youth wing of the Norwegian political party the Progress Party. It is generally considered to be more libertarian than the Progress Party itself. The organization has active chapters in all counties of Norway as well as in over 50 municipalities.

From 2012, Himanshu Gulati was the organisation's chairperson. Gulati is the first leader of a youth wing of a major Norwegian political party with multi-cultural background.  After being selected to the post of State Secretary in the Ministry of Justice, Gulati stepped down. In 2014, Atle Simonsen was elected chairperson Atle sat as chairman until 2016, when the annual national meeting of FpU elected Bjørn-Kristian Svendrud as the organisation's chairman. Atle now works as political adviser to Minister of Children and Equality Solveig Horne.

History 
The organization was officially founded by members of the Progress Party (FpU) on the annual party convention on 10–11 February 1978, the same convention where Carl I. Hagen was elected chairman of the party. The organization's first leader was the future mayor of Oslo, Peter N. Myhre, who served until 1984.

1994 Bolkesjø purge 

As soon as in 1989, rifts appeared within the FpU between a liberal and conservative faction. In the 1989 election several, hardline libertarians such as Pål Atle Skjervengen and Tor Mikkel Wara gained seats in the Storting and this further weakened the conservatives' position. That same year saw controversial proposals put forth by the liberals regarding gay marriage and immigration which sparked heated debates within among the youth members.

In 1992, the liberal Lars Grønntun was elected leader after a power struggle with Ingvar Myrvollen. This began a period of large-scale infighting which ultimately led to the board dissolving the organization, only to have the decision reversed by the party. After the expulsion of its entire liberal faction during the 1994 Progress Party national convention at Bolkesjø in Telemark, Ulf Leirstein became the new leader.

Recent history 
Norwegian secondary schools hold school elections. The organization consistently polls better there than its parent party and emerged as the largest party nationwide in 1989, 2003, 2005 and 2009. Recently, they have been out-polled by their social-democratic rivals from AUF. In 2009, FpU set a new membership record of 3,031 members, although this number dipped to 2,892 in 2010. Nevertheless, all political youth-organizations experienced an upsurge in new members in the aftermath of the 2011 Norway attacks.

Ideology and political positions 
In the organization's manifesto, it states: "The Progress Party's Youth supports a free-marked economy, regulated by supply and demand, without interference from government officials. A market economy is the economical system which gives the individual person greatest freedom of action". It also wishes to reform the welfare state with private insurance arrangements and increase privatization in the health and education sector, for one making the public hospitals "compete" with the privately owned hospitals for best possible care. It supports the legalization of medicinal cannabis, and more liberal drug laws in general.

Leadership

List of chairpersons 
 1978–1984: Peter N. Myhre
 1984–1987: Pål Atle Skjervengen 
 1987–1989: Tor Mikkel Wara 
 1989–1992: Jan Erik Fåne 
 1992–1994: Lars Erik Grønntun 
 1994–1995: Ulf Leirstein 
 1995–1996: Klaus Jakobsen 
 1996: Anders Anundsen 
 1996–1998: Reidar Helliesen 
 1998–1999: Anders Anundsen 
 1999–2002: Bård Hoksrud 
 2002–2008: Trond Birkedal
 2008–2012: Ove André Vanebo 
 2012–2014: Himanshu Gulati
 2014–2016: Atle Simonsen
 2016–: Bjørn-Kristian Svendsrud

Current Central Committee 
 Chairperson: Bjørn-Kristian Svendsrud
 First vice-chairperson: Kristian August Eilertsen 
 Second vice-chairperson: Christoffer Pedersen
 Member: Maria Alseth
 Member: Fredrik Juel Hagen
 Member: Bjørn Emil Forbord Nesset
 Member: Fredrik Johansen

External links 
 Official website
 Progress Party website

References 

1978 establishments in Norway
Progress Party (Norway)
Classical liberalism
Conservatism in Norway
Youth organizations established in 1978
Youth wings of Alliance of Conservatives and Reformists in Europe member parties
Youth wings of conservative parties
Youth wings of political parties in Norway